Lee Seul-chan (born 15 August 1993) is a South Korean footballer who plays as full back or defensive midfielder for Goyang KH FC.

Career

Club career
He joined Jeonnam Dragons in 2012.

In 2022, he left Daejeon Hana Citizen and joined K4 League side Goyang KH FC, which was founded in December 10th 2021.

Career statistics

References

External links 

Lee Seul-chan  at Rio 2016

1993 births
Living people
Association football fullbacks
Association football midfielders
South Korean footballers
Jeonnam Dragons players
Daejeon Hana Citizen FC players
K League 1 players
K League 2 players
Footballers at the 2016 Summer Olympics
Olympic footballers of South Korea
People from Gwangyang
Sportspeople from South Jeolla Province